72nd NYFCC Awards
January 7, 2007

Best Film: 
 United 93 

The 72nd New York Film Critics Circle Awards, honoring the best in film for 2006, were announced on 11 December 2006 and presented on 7 January 2007.

Winners

Best Actor:
Forest Whitaker – The Last King of Scotland
Runners-up: Ryan Gosling – Half Nelson and Sacha Baron Cohen – Borat: Cultural Learnings of America for Make Benefit Glorious Nation of Kazakhstan
Best Actress:
Helen Mirren – The Queen
Runners-up: Judi Dench – Notes on a Scandal and Meryl Streep – The Devil Wears Prada
Best Animated Feature:
Happy Feet
Runners-up: A Scanner Darkly and Cars
Best Cinematography:
Guillermo Navarro – Pan's Labyrinth (El laberinto del fauno)
Runners-up: Xiaoding Zhao – Curse of the Golden Flower (Man cheng jin dai huang jin jia) and Emmanuel Lubezki – Children of Men
Best Director:
Martin Scorsese – The Departed
Runners-up: Stephen Frears – The Queen and Clint Eastwood – Letters from Iwo Jima
Best Film:
United 93
Runners-up: The Queen and The Departed
Best First Film:
Ryan Fleck – Half Nelson
Runners-up: Jonathan Dayton and Valerie Faris – Little Miss Sunshine and Dito Montiel – A Guide to Recognizing Your Saints
Best Foreign Language Film:
Army of Shadows (L'armée des ombres) • France/Italy
Runners-up: Volver • Spain and The Death of Mr. Lazarescu (Moartea domnului Lăzărescu) • Romania
Best Non-Fiction Film:
Deliver Us from Evil
Runners-up: 49 Up, Borat: Cultural Learnings of America for Make Benefit Glorious Nation of Kazakhstan, and An Inconvenient Truth
Best Screenplay:
Peter Morgan – The Queen
Runners-up: William Monahan – The Departed and Michael Arndt – Little Miss Sunshine
Best Supporting Actor:
Jackie Earle Haley – Little Children
Runners-up: Eddie Murphy – Dreamgirls and Steve Carell – Little Miss Sunshine
Best Supporting Actress:
Jennifer Hudson – Dreamgirls
Runners-up: Shareeka Epps – Half Nelson and Catherine O'Hara – For Your Consideration

References

External links
 2006 Awards

2006
New York Film Critics Circle Awards
2006 in American cinema
New
New